Kvitskarvet is a mountain in Nathorst Land at Spitsbergen, Svalbard. It has a height of 1,102 m.a.s.l. The glacier of Kvitskarvbreen extends northwestwards from Kvitskarvet to the valley of Bromelldalen, and Sysselmannbreen extends southwestwards from Kvitskarvet to the valley of Steenstrupdalen.

References

Mountains of Spitsbergen